(in English and French sources Georges Gallesio, 23 May 1772 – 30 November 1839) was an Italian botanist and researcher of the 18th and 19th centuries, specializing in citrus. His famous book  was first printed in 1811 and reprinted in 1826 due to its popularity. In this work, he presented his findings that hybrids are offspring of outcross pollination and not due to grafting as previously thought. He also studied the family barriers affecting species compatibility and gave a good account of the history and distribution of citrus. He was widely cited in many works of his day, and also in The Citrus Industry book, by Webber, Batchelor and others.
 He has a further minor claim to fame as the first person to use the expression 'dominant' (in Italian, 'dominante') to refer to the hereditary transmission of characters when plants are hybridised ("Quindi la loro combinazione, non essendo naturale, riesce inconstante nei suoi effeti, e questi portano, ora l'impronta di un principio, ora di un altro, in proporzione che ve ne è uno dominante." Gallesio, Giorgio. Teoria della Riproduzione Vegetale, Pisa: Nicolo Capurro, 1816, p 79. English translation in Stubbe, Hans. History of Genetics, pp. 107–08). The term appears in a passage in which Gallesio describes the hybridisation of two strains of carnations having red and white flowers.

Bibliography

Biography

References

External links 

19th-century Italian botanists
1772 births
1839 deaths
18th-century Italian botanists